Domenico Distilo (born 25 December 1978 in Rome, Lazio, Italy) is a filmmaker living and working between Rome, Italy and Berlin, Germany.

He graduated in film direction from the Centro Sperimentale di Cinematografia in Rome with the film Unexpected (Inatteso), a documentary on the demand for political asylum in Italy, which was screened at the Festival dei Popoli in Florence and at the Berlinale, within the section "Forum" in 2006.

In 2008, he won the national prize Premio Solinas for the screenplay of the feature film When elephants fight (Quando gli elefanti combattono), written in collaboration with Filippo Gravino and Guido Iuculano.

In 2009, he joined the production company Sciara, where he works as director and producer.

In 2011, he directed two documentaries for RAI 3, the Italian cultural public channel: Urban extremes - Jerusalem (Estremi urbani, Gerusalemme), on the territorial conflict in Jerusalem and Romany imaginary - Minority artists (Immaginario Rom - Artisti Contro), on Romany art in Hungary.

Distilo's works generally focus on social issues, with a special interest in various forms of contemporary art.

In his movie Deep time (Margini di sottosuolo) (2012), he explored the boundaries between documentary and fiction with a story on archeology and the feelings that bound people to their past.

In 2018 his documentary Manga Do, Igort and the way of the manga won the audience award at the Biografilm Festival in Bologna. The film tells the journey of Igort, one of the most important Italian graphic novel authors, in the founding places of Japanese culture. The film follows a previous reportage, Igort, the secret landscape (2013), which tells the story of Igort's search for the creation of his trilogy on the Soviet Union.

Prizes and awards
 In 2000 his short film Entrevias won the first prize at the Messina Film Festival
 In 2006 Unexpected (Inatteso) won the first prize as best documentary at Alicante Film Festival and received the jury's special mention at the Arcipelago - Festival Internazionale di Cortometraggi e Nuove Immagini of Rome
 In 2008 the screenplay from When elephants fight (Quando gli elefanti combattono) won the first prize at the event Premio Solinas
 In 2011 Distilo won the Premio maestri del documentario at the Assaggi di realtà festival of Messina
 In 2018 Manga Do, Igort and the way of the manga was awarded the Audience award at the Biografilm Festival in Bologna

Filmography

Documentaries
 A day in Rome (Un giorno a Roma), (2001), produced by Centro Sperimentale di Cinematografia
 Tiburtina tells (Tiburtina racconta), (2005)
 Dialogues for Refugees (Dialoghi di Profughi), (2005)
 Unexpected (Inatteso), (2005), produced by Centro Sperimentale di Cinematografia
 CAM Selinunte, (2008), produced by Sciara
 The Calm and the Storm, (2010)
 Urban Extremes – Jerusalem (Estremi urbani - Gerusalemme), (2011), produced by Sciara
 Romany imaginary  - Minority artists (Immaginario Rom - Artisti contro), (2011), produced by Sciara
 Deep time  (Margini di Sottosuolo), (2012), produced by Sciara
 Igort, the secret landscape, (2013), produced by Sciara
 Manga Do, Igort and the way of the manga, (2018) produced by Sciara

Short films
 Entrevias, (2000)
 Bartleby, the scrivener (Bartleby, lo scrivano), (2004), an adaptation from Herman Melville's homonym tale produced by Centro Sperimentale di Cinematografia
 Laura in Lampedusa (Laura a Lampedusa), (2009), produced by Rai 1 for the programme "Vivo per te - 150 anni della Croce Rossa", broadcast on the 25th of December 2009

Projects
 The rope over the sea (Dawaz: la fune sul mare), a documentary with Adili Wuxiuer
 When elephants fight (Quando gli elefanti combattono), movie

References

External links
 Sciara production company's web site

Italian film directors
1978 births
Living people
Centro Sperimentale di Cinematografia alumni